Fred Barivure Kpakol is an accountant and politician. He served as   Rivers State Finance Commissioner between 2015 and 2019.He also served as the Commissioner for Agriculture between 2019 and 2022. He is a native of B-Dere in Gokana. He studied accounting and finance at the Rivers State University of Science and Technology and graduated with a B.Sc. in Accounting and Finance. He went further to do his masters in Banking and Finance at Federal University of Technology Owerri and he later had his Ph.D degree in Banking,Finance and Taxation from Rivers State University of Science and Technology. Kpakol is affiliated with the People's Democratic Party and has served as Chairman of Gokana local government area. He is also a former Secretary of the Association of Local Governments of Nigeria Rivers State Branch.

See also
List of people from Rivers State

References

Living people
People from Gokana
Rivers State Commissioners of Finance
Rivers State Peoples Democratic Party politicians
Mayors of places in Rivers State
First Wike Executive Council
Nigerian accountants
Year of birth missing (living people)